Longding district (Pron:/lɒŋˈdɪŋ/) is one of the 20 administrative districts of Arunachal Pradesh in northeastern India. It was carved out of the south-western portion of the Tirap District. The district shares its boundary to the south and south-east with the country of Myanmar. Its boundary to the west and the north are shared with the Indian states of Nagaland and Assam, respectively. Towards the north-east is the Tirap District from which the district was carved out in 2012. The district has a population of around 60000 and an area of roughly 1200 square kilometers. Longding has a pleasant climate throughout the year. Due to its hilly terrain, the temperature ranges from 15C (in winter) to 30C in summers).[1]

References

Cities and towns in Longding district
Longding district